American Dream Miami is a proposed megamall and entertainment complex planned to be built in Miami-Dade County, United States. If completed it will become the largest shopping mall in North America. The project shares its branding with American Dream Meadowlands in New Jersey the second largest mall in the USA, the mall is being developed by the Triple Five Group who own the 3 largest malls in North America, Mall of America, West Edmonton Mall and American Dream Meadowlands.

History
In March of 2015 the Triple Five Group announced plans for a megamall called "American World" however the name was later changed to American Dream Miami to match its sister project American Dream Meadowlands. The project was planned to be completed by 2020 and attract 30,000 visitors a day.

Also in 2017 the opening date of the project was pushed back to 2022 due to financing issues. Controversy also arose in 2017 & 2018 around the project that it could hurt the nearby Everglades National Park and create significant traffic problems along with adding to an oversaturated retail market in the region.

On May, 17, 2018, the county board gave final approval to the commercial zoning for the site, allowing Triple Five to begin obtaining the permits needed for construction, it was also announced the project would not receive any taxpayer funding. Within the month, the board of county commissioners approved Triple Five's plan to purchase state land for construction.

In May, 2018, nearby Broward County threatened a lawsuit against the project, arguing that Miami-Dade County underestimated the potential impact on Broward Country traffic.

The debate over construction of the mall became an issue in the Democratic primary of the 2018 Florida gubernatorial election, as candidate Gwen Graham was criticized by environmentalists, progressives, and UNITE HERE for her ties to the project.

Due to the Covid-19 Pandemic the mall was delayed and underwent design changes but stuck with the original design and the 2022 opening date scrapped and its current opening date is late 2026 and construction of the complex partially depends on the Florida Turnpike extension.

Plan 
The mall is planned to be in the Everglades region of Florida, near Everglades National Park but within the Miami-Dade County's Urban Development Boundary. The site was first dredged in the 1920s and used as a dairy farm by Ernest "Cap" Graham who later became a member of the Florida Senate he is also the founder of Graham Companies. The Graham family stopped running the dairy farm in the 1950s and the site became wetland and remains one of the large undeveloped areas with Miami-Dade's Urban Development Boundary. The mall is expected to cost over $5 Billion and currently has not started construction. At 6.2 million square feet the mall will be the largest in North America and 6th largest mall in the world.

Shopping 

 5 Anchor tenants
 3.5 million square feet of retail space

Attractions 

 Water park with indoor beach
 Amusement park
 Ferris Wheel
 Legoland Discovery Center
 Aquarium
 Ice rink
 Indoor ski slope 
 Artificial Lake (offering submarine rides similar to what West Edmonton Mall used to have alongside boat rides & water skiing)
 Art Deco Village
 Tivoli Garden

Hotels 

 300 room hotel
 400 room hotel
 900 room hotel

References

Shopping malls in Miami-Dade County, Florida
Indoor ski resorts
Buildings and structures under construction in the United States
Buildings and structures in Miami-Dade County, Florida
Tourist attractions in Miami-Dade County, Florida